The Flight Meteorologist insignia is a military badge decoration of the United States Navy which is issued to officers of the Restricted Line who are commissioned as weather and meteorology specialists.  To be issued the insignia, an officer must also have completed flight training to qualify as a Naval Aircrew Member.  The insignia itself is very similar to the Naval Aircrew Badge.

Personnel authorized the Flight Meteorologist insignia are most often assigned to aircraft such as the P-3 Orion and engage in weather surveillance and airborne monitoring duties.  A more dangerous activity of Flight Meteorologists is known as “hurricane chasing”, where a Navy aircraft will fly into a hurricane in order to gauge wind speed and other environmental measurements.

Navy precedence charts also list the Flight Meteorologist insignia as the Naval Aviation Observer Badge.  This previous name dates to the original concept of the badge in the 1930s, 1940s, 1950s, and early 1960s, when the decoration was classified as the Naval Aviation Observer insignia and issued to flight support personnel such as navigators, bombardiers, radar officers, non-Naval Aviator co-pilots, and other officer aircrew.  

In the 1940s, a slightly different version of this insignia was briefly issued with a silver compass rose centered on gold wings.  Designated as the Naval Aviation Observer (Navigation) insignia, or simply as Naval Navigator wings, it was issued to Navy aerial navigators between 1945 and 1948.  After 1948, Navy aerial navigators returned to wearing the Naval Aviation Observer insignia, although the former Naval Aviation Observer (Navigation) insignia continues to be awarded as the Marine Aerial Navigator insignia and Coast Guard Aerial Navigator insignia to Marine Corps and Coast Guard enlisted navigators in the KC-130 and HC-130 Hercules.   

An insignia similar to that of Flight Meteorologist were Naval Aviation Observer (NAO) wings.  NAOs were non-pilot officers in naval aircraft who flew in a variety of roles such as navigator, bombardier, radar intercept officer, tactical coordinator and electronic warfare officer.  Distinguishing the NAO insignia was a center device of a silver anchor within a silver circle and it was used by NAOs in both the Navy and Marine Corps from 1929 to 1968.  For Navy and Marine Corps aviation officers previously designated as Naval Aviation Observers, these officers were redesignated as Naval Flight Officers in 1966 and their insignia replaced by the current Naval Flight Officer insignia beginning in 1966 and completed by 1968.

In the modern Navy, the Naval Aviation Observer insignia is occasionally issued under its original name but is jointly known as the Flight Meteorologist insignia.

See also
 Military meteorology

United States military badges